is a train station located in Hakata-ku, Fukuoka in Japan. Its station symbol is a young male dressed in happi, representing the famous Hakata Gion Yamakasa, held in July each year.

Lines
Fukuoka City Subway
Kūkō Line

Platforms

Vicinity
Canal City Hakata
TVQ Kyūshū Broadcasting
Fukuoka Chamber of Commerce
Hakata Ward Office
Kushida Shrine
Tochoji Temple
Hakata Machiya Folk Museum

References

Sources
https://gionfestival.org/blog-ofune-boko-return/

Railway stations in Fukuoka Prefecture
Kūkō Line (Fukuoka City Subway)
Railway stations in Fukuoka, Fukuoka